Gary Scott Winick (March 31, 1961February 27, 2011) was an American filmmaker whose films as a director include Tadpole (2002) and 13 Going on 30 (2004), and who also produced such films as Pieces of April (2003) and November (2004) through his New York City-based independent film production company InDigEnt.

Biography
Born in Manhattan, New York City, Gary Winick attended Columbia Grammar and Preparatory School in that borough, graduating in 1979.  A 1984 graduate of Tufts University, he went on to receive Master of Fine Arts degree from both the University of Texas at Austin and the AFI Conservatory.

Winick directed the films Out of the Rain (1991), Tadpole (2002), 13 Going on 30 (2004), and the live-action remake of Charlotte's Web (2006). His final films were Bride Wars and Letters to Juliet. He produced such films as Pieces of April (2003) and November (2004) through his New York City-based independent film production company InDigEnt, founded in 1999.

Death
Winick died in Manhattan on February 27, 2011, following a years-long battle with brain cancer. He was 49 years old.

Filmography

Awards
 2002 Independent Spirit John Cassavetes Award for producing  Personal Velocity

References

External links

1961 births
2011 deaths
AFI Conservatory alumni
American film editors
Columbia Grammar & Preparatory School alumni
Deaths from brain cancer in the United States
Deaths from cancer in New York (state)
Film directors from New York City
Film producers from New York (state)
Independent Spirit Award winners
Moody College of Communication alumni
People from Manhattan
Tufts University alumni